Ivanić is a Croatian and Serbian surname. Notable people with the surname include:

Delfa Ivanić (1881–1972), Serbian painter, humanitarian and writer
Dragutin Ivanić, Croatian pilot
Dušan Ivanić (born 1946), Croatian-born Serbian literary historian
Mirko Ivanić (born 1993), Serbian-born Montenegrin footballer
Mladen Ivanić (born 1958), Bosnian Serb politician
Ivan Ivanić (1867–1935), a Yugoslav diplomat
Matija Ivanić (c. 1445–1523), citizen of Hvar who led a rebellion against the Venetian Republic
Rosalind Ivanić (born 1949), Yugoslav-born British linguist

See also
 
 Ivančić
Ivanović

Croatian surnames
Serbian surnames
Patronymic surnames
Surnames from given names